The Gamsberg is a mountain in the Appenzell Alps, overlooking the region of Walenstadt in the canton of St. Gallen. Located in the Alvier group it is the culminating point of the range lying between Lake Walenstadt and Toggenburg.

The summit is relatively difficult to access. There is no trail leading to the top.

Not to be confused with the mountain of the same name in Namibia.

References

External links

Gamsberg on Hikr

Mountains of the Alps
Mountains of Switzerland
Mountains of the canton of St. Gallen
Appenzell Alps